Lady Borton is a Quaker author and journalist.  During the Vietnam War she volunteered for the American Friends Service Committee and then lived in Vietnam for many years.  Her works include After Sorrow – an account of her time in Vietnam and the people there.

 American Quakers